Jiang Na (born 18 October 1988) is a Chinese retired ice hockey defenceman.  She was a member of the Chinese women's national ice hockey team and represented China in the women's ice hockey tournament at the 2010 Winter Olympics.

References

External links 
 
 
 
 
 

1988 births
Living people
Chinese women's ice hockey defencemen
Sportspeople from Harbin
Ice hockey players at the 2010 Winter Olympics
Olympic ice hockey players of China
Asian Games medalists in ice hockey
Ice hockey players at the 2007 Asian Winter Games
Ice hockey players at the 2011 Asian Winter Games
Medalists at the 2007 Asian Winter Games
Medalists at the 2011 Asian Winter Games
Asian Games bronze medalists for China
21st-century Chinese women